Chinilpa, Korean collaborators with Imperial Japan or chinilbanminjokhaengwija is a derogatory Korean language term that denotes ethnic Koreans who collaborated with Imperial Japan during the protectorate period of the Korean Empire from 1905 and its colonial rule in Korea from 1910 to 1945. The term is distinct from ji-ilpa (Hangul: 지일파; Hanja: 知日派, lit. "knowledgeable-about-Japan faction"), which has a politically neutral connotation. 

Chinilpa was popularized in post-independence Korea for Koreans considered national traitors for collaborating with the Japanese colonial government and fighting against the Korean independence movement. Chinilpa also applies to Koreans that had sought greater alliance or unification with Japan in the last years of Joseon Dynasty, such as Iljinhoe and the Five Eulsa Traitors.

Etymology
The term "Chinilpa" (Korean: 친일파) for those who collaborated with the Imperial Japanese rule in Korea first appears in Chinilmunhangnon (Comments on Chinil Literature, 친일문학론, 1966), written by Im Jong-Guk, who was an activist of Korea. Before its publication, it was common to call them builbae (Hangul: 부일배; Hanja: 附日輩) which translates literally to "people who collaborated with Japan", especially criticizing Korean Leadership.

Anti-Chinilpa politics

Chinilpa is often identified with "far-right" (극우), "Nazi collaborators" (나치 협력자), or "fascists" (파시스트), because Japan was a member of the Axis powers during World War II in the past.

Korea

In Korea, Chinilpa is identified with a French Nazi collaborator. South Korean historians pointed out that the U.S. military government, Syngman Rhee dictatorship, and military dictatorship guaranteed Chinilpa their vested interests without properly punishing him. This contrasts with France, which severely punished and retaliated against Nazi collaborators after World War II.

South Korea

In South Korean politics, liberals or progressives and conservatives tend to criticize each other as "pro-Japan" and "Pro-Pyongyang" (or "Jongbuk"). South Korea has historically experienced Japanese colonial rule and the Korean War, so the former is regarded as the "fascist" or "far-right" and the latter as the "ppalgaengi" or "far-left".

Many South Korean liberals and progressives believe that the Chinlipa purge is the same as the anti-Nazi activism in Israel.

"Sin-chinilpa" is used in a similar sense to "Tochak Waegu". The term "Sin-chinilpa" was first proposed by Japanese-born naturalized South Korean and South Korean liberal historian Yuji Hosaka, and is frequently used by South Korean media and netizens. Yuji Hosaka is argued that the excessive influx of Japanese culture such as J-pop, anime, and manga into the South Korea is increasing the number of "New Chinilpa" in the South Korea. He negatively evaluated Japanese culture, saying that this was deliberately encouraged by the Japanese government. He also criticized the "Anti-Japan Tribalism" discourse as "slavery grit" that internalized the "hate of Korean" in Japanese right-wing or far-right forces, and argued that the anti-Japan sentiment of South Koreans was absolutely justified.

Prosecution of Chinilpa gained increasing support in South Korea after the gradual democratization during the 1980s and 1990s, and the first anti-Chinilpa legislation, the Special law to redeem pro-Japanese collaborators' property, was passed in 2005.

Japan

In the 1970s, Japanese New Left supported anti-Park liberal Korean nationalists' perception of "Chinilpa". They recognized the Park Chung-hee and Park Chung-hee governments, then dictators of South Korea, as "Chinilpa".

History

Colonial period 
While it has taken on a meaning of "[national] traitor", only a minority of the early chinilpa were opportunists, as most of the chinilpa high officials in the beginning believed they were doing what was in the best interests of their country as it struggled to adapt to modernity; the chinilpa were one of a number of factions that existed at that time which were concerned with modernizing Korea along a pattern set by another country (e.g. Russian faction, Chinese faction, American faction, and so on). However, the term itself was not coined until 1966 by scholar Im Chongguk (1929–1989).

Treatment of chinilpa following independence
In the immediate liberation of Korea, American General Douglas MacArthur initially requested that the Japanese colonial authorities and their Korean trainees continue to run Korea until natives could be trained to replace them. Nonetheless, Korean outrage did lead to the former being purged, but many of the latter chinilpa were able to hold onto their positions. Similar to the United States' incomplete denazification of Germany and reverse course in Japan, the United States Military Government of Korea saw these right-wing chinilpa officials as useful in light of the nascent Cold War and deteriorating situation in the Korean Peninsula.

The Special Committee for Prosecution of Anti-National Offenders (banmin teugwi, 반민특위) was set up in 1948  to prosecute the chinilpa. It handled 682 cases; 559 cases were handed over to a special prosecutor's office, which handed down indictments in 221 cases. A special tribunal tried 38 cases, sentenced guilty verdicts and punishments in 12 cases including one death sentence. Eighteen others had their civil rights suspended, six others were declared innocent and the remaining two were found guilty but were exempted from punishment. However, the Supreme Court suspended their execution in March 1950, just before the Korean War.

The dictator at that time, Syngman Rhee, sabotaged and dissolved the banmin teugwi. Under Rhee's regime and in subsequent governments before the Sixth Republic, many of them enjoyed the same wealth and power they had under Japanese rule. Rhee employed many former collaborators in government and military in order to combat North Korea and communist sympathizers in South Korea. The next of South Korea's prominent dictators, Park Chung-hee, was himself a chinilpa who served in the Imperial Japanese military system. During the Cold War, chinilpa was seen as a somewhat taboo subject given that many authorities were at one time collaborators themselves, and thus criticism of chinilpa could be seen as questioning the legitimacy of the regime. Similar pressure to silence was also applied to some chinilpa literary figures.

An early study into chinilpa was done by "maverick scholar" Im Chongguk (1929–1989), whose 1966 work Ch'inil Munhak-ron (친일문학론 Treatise on Pro-Japanese Literature) broke the silence on the subject matter. Although it was obscure in its day and didn't have a wide readership, a smattering of articles on the subject appeared in the late 1970's and by the 1980's, Chongguk took his quarter-century's worth of study on the subject and began to publish more systemic works about chinilpa in general, not just literary studies. Chongguk's personal zeal about honestly examining darker pages from national history were not very popular in his day, but by the 1990's, his legacy had strengthened and the topic became more accepted by the South Korean public. However, the old stigma still persisted to some extent in academia, as established mainstream scholars were seemingly "reluctant to dabble in such an irrelevant and 'humiliating' subject" as chinilpa, and much of the interest and writing on the topic came from junior scholars and nonacademics such as independent researchers, literary critics, and journalists.

Prosecution of chinilpa in the 21st century
After more than 50 years have passed since the end of prosecution of chinilpa under the Syngman Rhee administration, the prosecution restarted abruptly as a political agenda of President Roh Moo-hyun.

Definition of chinilpa by the Special Law
The newly enacted Special Law on the Inspection of Collaborations for the Japanese Imperialism defines "pro-Japanese and anti-national actions" (chinilpa) as follows.
article 2
Under this act, the "pro-Japanese and anti-national actions" means any of the following actions committed between the outbreak of the Russo-Japanese War that began the deprivation of Korean sovereignty by the Japanese imperialism and August 15, 1945.
1. Any act to attack or order to attack the military forces fighting against the Japanese imperialism to keep sovereign power.
3. Any act to kill, execute, harass or arrest the persons or their families participating in the independent movement or anti-Japanese movement, and an act to instruct or order those violences thereto.
6. Any act to agree, join or conspire the treaties that interfered with the sovereign power including Eulsa Treaty, Korean-Japanese Annexation Treaty and others.
8. Any act of participating in the Assembly of Japanese Empire as a member of the Noble Class or member of Japanese Assembly.
9. Any act of participating as vice chairman, advisor or House of Representatives for the Senate of the Choson Government-General.
10. Any act of positively cooperate with the invasion war (WW2) as an officer above lieutenant of the Japanese imperial forces.
14. Any act to operate the military supply manufacturing to help the warfare of the Japanese imperialism or donate certain amount of or more money and goods determined under the Presidential Decree.

The law is concerned about the independence movement, unlike the ex-Nazi prosecution which concentrates on the war crimes. Most remarkable are items 8 and 9. Being a law-maker during that time qualifies one as a "pro-Japanese and anti-national Collaborator" regardless of what one did as a law-maker.

Developments
On August 29, 2005, a civic organization, the Institute for Research in Collaborationist Activities disclosed a list of 3094 Koreans chinilpa suspects including Park Chung Hee, the former Korean president, Kim Song Su, a former publisher of Dong-a Ilbo and the founder of Korea University, and Bang Eung Mo, a former president of Chosun Ilbo. 

On December 6, 2006, a South Korean presidential commission, the Investigative Commission on Pro-Japanese Collaborators' Property revealed the first official chinilpa list of 106 persons during 1904 to March 1st Movement in 1919 was including four of the Five Eulsa Traitors.

On August 18, 2006, the commission started the investigation before seizing the property obtained by collaborators during Japanese colonization.

On May 2, 2007, the South Korean government announced its plan to seize assets gained by pro-Japanese collaborators during Japanese colonial rule amounting 3.6 billion won (US$3.9 million, €2.8 million) worth of land from the descendants of nine pro-Japanese collaborators. On August 13, 2007, the commission decided to confiscate about 1 million square meters of land valued at 25.7 billion won that is now owned by the descendants of another ten pro-Japanese collaborators. 

On September 17, 2007, the commission revealed the second list of 202 collaborators focused on pro-Japanese figures between 1919 and 1937. The list includes Song Byeong-jun who sent letters to the Japanese government asking for a merger, Lee Ji-yong, who is one of the Five Eulsa Traitors, Lee Doo-hwang, who participated in the murder of Empress Myeongseong in 1895 and later became a governor of the North Jeolla Province, a novelist Yi In-jik, the author of Hyeoleuinu (Tears of Blood), Yoo Hak-ju, a council member of the Iljinhoe, Bae Jeong-ja, foster daughter of the first Resident-General of Korea who spied on Korean independence activists and recruited comfort women, and Park Je-bin, who formed a tribute group to pay condolences at Ito's funeral in 1926. On the same day, the Seoul administrative court rejected a lawsuit against the commission to erase the names of the son and grandson of Daewon-gun (father of Gojong of the Korean Empire) from the list, who allegedly attended the signing of the Japan-Korea Annexation Treaty as representatives of the royal family.

The official list during the most controversial period (1937–1945) that may contain persons who played important roles in South Korean development after the independence and enlisted in the 2005 list of the Institute for Research in Collaborationist Activities had not been revealed as of September 2007.

Since the enactment of the Special Law on the Inspection of Collaboration with Japanese Imperialism (:ko:친일진상규명법) in 2004 and the special law to redeem pro-Japanese collaborators' property in 2005, the committee has made a list of 452 pro-Japanese collaborators and examined the land of 109 among them. The total size of the land is estimated at 13.1 million square meters, worth almost 100 billion won.

The confiscated properties will be appropriated, with priority, to reward Koreans who contributed to the independence of Korea from Japan.

See also
Japanese war crimes
Statism in Shōwa Japan
Anti-Japanese sentiment in Korea
Tochak Waegu
Five Eulsa Traitors
New Right (South Korea) – It is led by descendants of those who collaborated with the Shōwa Statism during the time when Korea under Japanese rule.
The Chosun Ilbo
Japan–Korea disputes
Japan–Korea relations
Race traitor
Harki – They are regarded as traitors in independent Algeria and thousands were killed after the war in reprisals despite the Évian Accords ceasefire and amnesty stipulations.
Quisling – Scandinavian and English equivalent
Makapili – Filipino equivalent
Hanjian – ethnic Chinese equivalent
Razakar (Pakistan) – Bangladeshi equivalent

References

External links
Special Law on the Inspection of Collaborations for the Japanese Imperialism
Presidential Committee for the Inspection of Collaborations for Japanese Imperialism
Investigative Commission on Pro-Japanese Collaborators' Property
  일제강점하 반민족행위 진상규명에 관한 특별법
  친일파 목록 (List of chinilpa)

 
Anti-Japanese sentiment in Korea
Anti-nationalism in Korea
Far-right politics in Asia
Far-right politics in South Korea
Fascism in South Korea
Japanese imperialism and colonialism
Sadaejuui
Shōwa Statism